The 1995 Robert Morris Colonials football team represented Robert Morris College, now Robert Morris University, as an independent during the 1995 NCAA Division I-AA football season. The Colonials were led by 2nd-year head coach Joe Walton and played their home games at Moon Stadium on the campus of Moon Area High School. This was the second season of the Colonials' football program's existence.

Schedule

References

Robert Morris
Robert Morris Colonials football seasons
Robert Morris Colonials football